The 1908 Notre Dame Fighting Irish football team represented the University of Notre Dame during the 1908 college football season. The team compiled an 8–1 record, outscored their opponents by a total of 326 to 20, not allowing any opponents to cross their goal line during the season (all points against them were from field goals).

Schedule

References

Notre Dame
Notre Dame Fighting Irish football seasons
Notre Dame Fighting Irish football